Thomas Paul Schirrmacher (born 25 June 1960) is a German Christian moral philosopher and a specialist in the Sociology of Religion and religious freedom. He is known as a global human rights activist and holds a chair in Theology (Ethics, Missiology, World Religions).

Schirrmacher serves the World Evangelical Alliance as secretary general and as chair of the Theological Commission. He is also an Anglican realignment bishop.

Since 2014 he is president of the International Council of the International Society for Human Rights and director of the International Institute for Religious Freedom.

Biography

Family 
Thomas Schirrmacher was born on June 25, 1960 to the German professor of Telecommunications engineering Bernd Schirrmacher and his wife Ingeborg. His grandfather is the history professor Friedrich Wilhelm Schirrmacher while his great-grandfather is Carl Friedrich Schirrmacher, Director of the Danzig St. Petri School. The Schirrmacher family are Huguenots who were exiled from Salzburg in the 18th century and subsequently settled in Danzig, Prussia.

Thomas Schirrmacher is married to Christine Schirrmacher who is a professor of Islamic Studies in Bonn, Germany.

Education 

Thomas Schirrmacher studied theology from 1978 to 1982 at STH Basel (Switzerland) and since 1983 Cultural Anthropology and Comparative Religion at University of Bonn. He earned a Drs. theol. in Missiology and Ecumenism at Theological University (Kampen/Netherlands) in 1984, and a Dr. theol. in Missiology and Ecumenics at Theological University of the Reformed Churches (Kampen/Netherlands) in 1985, a Ph.D. in Cultural Anthropology at Pacific Western University (today: California Miramar University) in Los Angeles (CA) in 1989, a Th.D. in Ethics at Whitefield Theological Seminary in Lakeland (FL) in 1996, and a Dr. phil. in Comparative Religion and Sociology of Religion at University of Bonn in 2007. In 1997 he got honorary doctorates (D.D.) from Cranmer Theological House and in 2006 from ACTS Academy of Higher Education in Bangalore.

Career 

Between 1982 and 1986 Schirrmacher was pastor of several church communities in Bonn. From 1996 to 2018, Thomas Schirrmacher was rector of the private Martin Bucer Seminary, a theological seminary seated in Bonn (Germany) with campuses in several countries which he founded, and where he continues to teach systematic theology (especially ethics) as well as comparative religion studies and is vice president for International Affairs. From 1994 to 1998 Schirrmacher was professor of missions at the Philadelphia Theological Seminary and since 1995 he is professor for systematic theology at the Whitefield Theological Seminary. He is also a professor for the sociology of religion at the West University of Timişoara and lecturer in the Advanced Programme “Human Rights and Religious Freedom” at Oxford University (Regent's Park College, Oxford).

Schirrmacher was chairman of the Board of Trustees of the Gebende Hände gGmbH (German: Giving Hands charitable Gesellschaft mit beschränkter Haftung), an internationally active relief organisation, and now is its senior advisor. He is member of the commission for religious freedom of the World Evangelical Alliance and since 2008 president of the International Institute for Religious Freedom (Bonn, Brussels/Geneva, Cape Town, Colombo, Brasília). He also is their speaker for human rights. According to media he is one of the leading experts on the topic of persecution of Christians. Several times he was speaking as expert on human rights in the German Parliament. In October 2015 he was the only evangelical member of the Catholic synod on family lead by Pope Francis. He is president of the International Society for Human Rights, manager of the Religious Liberty Commission of the German and the Swiss Evangelical Alliance, and director of the International Institute for Religious Freedom with regional offices for most continents: Brasilia (Latin America), Brussels/Bonn (Europe), Cape Town (Africa), Colombo and Delhi (Asia), which cooperates with the UN Special Rapporteur for Freedom of Religion or Belief.

In 2016 he was ordained as bishop of the Communio Christiana (a church in the Anglican realignment).
On October 27, 2020, Schirrmacher was elected the next General Secretary of the World Evangelical Alliance. His term of office begins in March 2021.

Another main focus of the work of Schirrmacher besides religious freedom in the area of human rights is the fight against human trafficking.

He speaks with church leaders like Pope Benedict XVI, Pope Francis, and the Ecumenical Patriarch Bartholomew I and gives lectures all around the world. He is also consultant of the Faith and Order Commission, the Theological Commission of the World Council of Churches, chair of the Board of Advisors of the Central Council of Oriental Christians in Germany (ZOCD), and Member of the International Committee of the Global Christian Forum.

He has authored and edited more than 100 books, which have been translated into 17 languages.

Honours 
Schirrmacher received the following honours:

 1996: Honorary doctorate for his “Ethics” from Whitefield Theological Seminary (Lakeland/Florida)
 1997: Honorary doctorate from the Anglican Cranmer Theological House
 2002: ‘Man of Achievement’ in ethics of international development, International Biographical Center Oxford
 2006: Honorary doctorate at the ACTS Academy of Higher Education in Bangalore, India
 2007: Dr. phil. University of Bonn, Franz-Delitzsch-Förderpreis for his dissertation on ‘Hitlers Kriegsreligion’ 
 2008: Human Rights Award Pro Fide
 2016: Magister Praetor Order of merit for achievements relating to the planning of a civic central council of Christians in the Near East and Middle East (Oriental Christian Council) and for promoting the House of Ghassan, specifically noting “that he [enabled] the House’s personal contact to Pope Francis and to the Ecumenical Patriarch Bartholomew”
 2016: Knight Grand Cross the highest order of the knightly order “Equestrian Order of Michael Archangel” for his efforts in the cause of human rights and religious freedom in the Near and Middle East
 2017: ‘Stephanus-Sonderpreis’ for religious freedom by the Stephanus-Stiftung (Frankfurt)
 2021: Honorary doctorate for its commitment to Christian ethics, human rights, and oppressed and persecuted Christians from the Johann Heinrich Pestalozzi Christian University
 2022: Health Media Award (London) for his global commitment to basic health services

Works

Books (selection) 
 .
 .
 .
 .
 .
 .
 .
  (in 14 languages)
 .
 .
 .
 .
 .
 .
 .
 .
 .
 .
 .
 .
 .
 .

Articles (selection) 
  (referenced on p. 395 of Dawkins' The God Delusion).
 .
 .
 
  (referenced on p. 544 of Ronald Numbers' The Creationists).
 .
 .
 .
 .
 .
 .
 .

See also 

 John Warwick Montgomery
 Christine Schirrmacher, a German academic who specialises in Islamic Studies, and is Schirrmacher's wife.
 Friedrich Wilhelm Schirrmacher, historian and Schirrmacher's great-grandfather

References

External links 
 .
 Thomas Schirrmacher on the website of the Word Evangelical Alliance

Missiologists
German sociologists
German evangelicals
German human rights activists
Living people
1960 births
Place of birth missing (living people)
German male writers